For the first time in Grey Cup history, the same two teams challenged for the trophy for the third consecutive year. But unlike the previous two years, the Toronto Argonauts needed some late game heroics to win their third consecutive title.

Regular season

Final regular season standings
Note: GP = Games Played, W = Wins, L = Losses, T = Ties, PF = Points For, PA = Points Against, Pts = Points

Bold text means that they have clinched the playoffs.

Grey Cup playoffs
Note: All dates in 1947

Semifinals 

Hamilton advances to the ORFU Final.

Ottawa advances to the ORFU Final.

Finals 

Winnipeg won the total-point series by 29–22. Winnipeg advances to the Grey Cup game.

Ottawa will play the Toronto Argonauts in the Eastern finals.

Toronto won the total-point series by 24–0. Toronto will play the Ottawa Trojans in the Eastern finals.

Eastern Finals

Toronto advances to the Grey Cup game.

Playoff bracket

Grey Cup Championship

Needing to beat the clock, the Argos had a quick huddle, and Joe Krol, a Grey Cup hero for many seasons, angled a kick away from the Winnipeg safety, over the goal line and into touch for the winning point as time expired.

1947 Eastern (Combined IRFU & ORFU) All-Stars
NOTE: During this time most players played both ways, so the All-Star selections do not distinguish between some offensive and defensive positions.
1st Team
QB – Frank Filchock, Hamilton Tigers
FW – Tony Golab, Ottawa Rough Riders
HB – Royal Copeland, Toronto Argonauts
HB – Joe Krol, Toronto Argonauts
FB – Virgil Wagner, Montreal Alouettes
E  – Joe Farley, Ottawa Trojans
E  – Bert Haigh, Ottawa Rough Riders
C  – Don Loney, Ottawa Rough Riders
G – Don McKenzie, Toronto Balmy Beach Beachers
G – Bill Zock, Toronto Argonauts
T – Herb Trawick, Montreal Alouettes
T – Hank Christman, Ottawa Rough Riders2nd Team
QB – Mel Lawson, Hamilton Wildcats
FW – Don McFarlane, University of Western Ontario
HB – Bob Paffrath, Toronto Indians
HB – Jack Perry, University of Western Ontario
FB – Doug Smylie, Ottawa Trojans
E  – Matt Anthony, Ottawa Rough Riders
E  – Gord Lawson, Hamilton Wildcats
C  – Doug Turner, Toronto Argonauts
G – Eddie Remigis, Hamilton Tigers
G – Bud Donald, Hamilton Wildcats
T – Gerry Duck, University of Western Ontario
T – Steve Chamko, Windsor Rockets

1947 Western (Western Interprovincial Football Union) All-Stars
NOTE: During this time most players played both ways, so the All-Star selections do not distinguish between some offensive and defensive positions.
QB – Stan Stasica, Regina Roughriders
FW – Del Wardien, Regina Roughriders
HB – Gabe Patterson, Regina Roughriders
HB – Paul Rowe, Calgary Stampeders
FB – Bob Sandberg, Winnipeg Blue Bombers
E  – Johnny Bell, Regina Roughriders
E  – Ken Sluman, Calgary Stampeders
E  – Red Noel, Regina Roughriders
C  – Mel Wilson, Winnipeg Blue Bombers
G – Doug Drew, Regina Roughriders
G – Bert Iannone, Winnipeg Blue Bombers
T – Bob Pullar, Calgary Stampeders
T – Bob Smith, Winnipeg Blue Bombers

1947 Ontario Rugby Football Union All-Stars
NOTE: During this time most players played both ways, so the All-Star selections do not distinguish between some offensive and defensive positions.
QB – Mel Lawson, Hamilton Wildcats
HB – Bob Cunningham, Toronto Balmy Beach Beachers
HB – Bill Petrilas, Ottawa Trojans
DB – Bob Paffrath, Toronto Indians
E  – George Farley, Ottawa Trojans
E  – Gord Lawson, Hamilton Wildcats
FW – Bill Murmylyk, Hamilton Wildcats
C  – Baz Petry, Toronto Balmy Beach Beachers
C  – Fred Gabriel, Hamilton Wildcats
G  – Don McKenzie, Toronto Balmy Beach Beachers
G  – Bud Donald, Hamilton Wildcats
T  – Steve Chamko, Windsor Rockets
T  – Vic Ghetti, Windsor Rockets

1947 Canadian Football Awards
 Jeff Russel Memorial Trophy (IRFU MVP) – Virgil Wagner (RB), Montreal Alouettes
 Jeff Nicklin Memorial Trophy (WIFU MVP) - Bob Sandberg (RB), Regina Roughriders
 Gruen Trophy (IRFU Rookie of the Year) - Nelson Greene (FB), Ottawa Rough Riders
 Imperial Oil Trophy (ORFU MVP) - Bob Paffrath - Toronto Indians

References

 
Canadian Football League seasons
Grey Cups hosted in Toronto